The Labor Party of Liberia (LPL) is a political party in Liberia. It fielded candidates in the 11 October 2005 elections.

LPL candidate Joseph Woah-Tee won 0.6% of the vote in the presidential poll. The party failed to win any seats in the Senate or House of Representatives.

Labour parties
Political parties in Liberia